The Hall XP2H-1 was an American prototype four-engined biplane flying boat of the 1930s.  Intended as an experimental very-long-range maritime patrol aircraft, a single example was built. The XP2H-1 was the largest four engine biplane aircraft ever procured by the US Navy.

Development and design

In 1930, the United States Navy ordered a single example of a large flying boat from the Hall-Aluminum Aircraft Corporation, to meet a requirement for an experimental very-long-range patrol aircraft.  The resulting design, designated XP2H-1, was a four-engined biplane with an all-aluminum hull, scaled-up from the smaller PH flying boat, which accommodated a crew of six.  The wings were of fabric-skinned aluminum construction and were of trapezoidal shape.  The water-cooled V-12 Curtiss V-1570 Conqueror engines were mounted in tandem push-pull pairs between the wings, in nacelles attached to the lower wings.

The XP2H-1 first flew on November 15, 1932, and was extensively tested, demonstrating excellent performance, being  faster than predicted. It was possible to cruise on just two engines to extend range, and in 1935, the XP2H-1 was used to carry out a nonstop flight between Norfolk, Virginia and Coco Solo, Panama Canal Zone. The XP2H-1 took 25 hours and 15 minutes to fly the  distance between these two locations.  It was destroyed later in the year attempting to alight in open water.  No further P2Hs were built, with the US Navy equipping its patrol squadrons with smaller flying boats such as the Consolidated P2Y.

Operators

United States Navy

Specifications

See also

References

 "For Long Range Patrol". Flight, 24 January 1935. p. 94.
"A Long Distance Flight" Flight, 21 February 1935, p. 195. 
 Boyne, Walter J. "The Flying Hallmarks: The Hall Aluminium Classics". The Best of Wings Magazine. Washington, DC:Brasseys, 2001. . pp. 52–61. 
 Loftin, Laurence K. Quest for Performance:The Evolution of Modern Aircraft,SP-468. Washington, DC: National Aeronautics and Space Administration, History Office, Scientific and Technical Information Branch, 1985.
 Wegg, John. General Dynamic Aircraft and their Predecessors. London:Putnam, 1990. .

Flying boats
1930s United States patrol aircraft
Four-engined push-pull aircraft
P2H
Biplanes
Aircraft first flown in 1932